Ahern State Park is a  state protected area in Laconia on Lake Winnisquam in New Hampshire's Lakes Region. It is open year-round and offers hiking, non-motorized boating, biking, and fishing. It features  of lake shoreline.

History
The property was originally part of Laconia State School, originally known as the New Hampshire School for Feebleminded Children, which opened in 1903 and closed in 1991. The state reserved  as Governor's State Park in 1994 and renamed it Ahern State Park in 1998.

References

External links
Ahern State Park New Hampshire Department of Natural and Cultural Resources
Ahern State Park Map New Hampshire Department of Natural and Cultural Resources

State parks of New Hampshire
Parks in Belknap County, New Hampshire